Praomyini is a tribe of muroid rodents in the subfamily Murinae. Species in this tribe are found mostly throughout Sub-Saharan Africa, but one species (Mastomys erythroleucus) is found in North Africa, and another (Ochromyscus yemeni) is found in the Arabian Peninsula. In addition, one fossil genus (Karnimata) is known, which inhabited India and Pakistan (in addition to Kenya) during the Late Miocene.

Species

Recent species 
Species in the tribe include:

Genus Chingawaemys 
 Chingawa forest rat, Chingawaemys rarus
 Genus Colomys
 African wading rat, Colomys goslingi
Genus Congomys
 Lukolela swamp rat, Congomys lukolelae
 Verschuren's swamp rat, Congomys verschureni
 Genus Heimyscus
 African smoky mouse, Heimyscus fumosus
 Genus Hylomyscus - African wood mice
 H. aeta group
 Beaded wood mouse, Hylomyscus aeta
 Hylomyscus grandis
 H. alleni group
 Allen's wood mouse, Hylomyscus alleni
 Angolan wood mouse, Hylomyscus carillus
 Stella wood mouse, Hylomyscus stella
 Walter Verheyen's mouse, Hylomyscus walterverheyeni
 H. anselli group
 Ansell's wood mouse, Hylomyscus anselli
 Arc Mountain wood mouse, Hylomyscus arcimontensis
 H. baeri group
 Baer's wood mouse, Hylomyscus baeri
 H. denniae group
 Montane wood mouse, Hylomyscus denniae
 Small-footed forest mouse, Hylomyscus endorobae
 Hylomyscus vulcanorum
 H. parvus group
 Little wood mouse, Hylomyscus parvus
 Genus Mastomys - multimammate rats
 Angolan multimammate mouse, Mastomys angolensis
 Awash multimammate mouse, Mastomys awashensis
 Southern multimammate mouse, Mastomys coucha
 Guinea multimammate mouse, Mastomys erythroleucus
 Hubert's multimammate mouse, Mastomys huberti
 Verheyen's multimammate mouse, Mastomys kollmannspergeri
 Natal multimammate mouse, Mastomys natalensis
 Shortridge's multimammate mouse, Mastomys shortridgei
 Genus Montemys
 Delectable soft-furred mouse, Montemys delectorum
 Genus Myomyscus
 Verreaux's mouse, Myomyscus verreauxii
Genus Nilopegamys
 Ethiopian amphibious rat, Nilopegamys plumbeus (possibly extinct)
 Genus Ochromyscus - rock mice
 Brockman's rock mouse or Brockman's white-footed rat, Ochromyscus brockmani
 Yemeni mouse, Ochromyscus yemeni
 Genus Praomys - African soft-furred rats
 Praomys coetzeei
 Dalton's mouse, Praomys daltoni
 De Graaff's soft-furred mouse, Praomys degraaffi
 Deroo's mouse, Praomys derooi
 Hartwig's soft-furred mouse, Praomys hartwigi
 Jackson's soft-furred mouse, Praomys jacksoni
 Least soft-furred mouse, Praomys minor
 Misonne's soft-furred mouse, Praomys misonnei
 Cameroon soft-furred mouse, Praomys morio
 Muton's soft-furred mouse, Praomys mutoni
 Gotel Mountain soft-furred mouse, Praomys obscurus
 Peter's soft-furred mouse, Praomys petteri
 Forest soft-furred mouse, Praomys rostratus
 Tullberg's soft-furred mouse, Praomys tullbergi
 Genus Serengetimys
 Dwarf multimammate mouse, Serengetimys pernanus
 Genus Stenocephalemys - Ethiopian narrow-headed rats
 Ethiopian white-footed mouse, Stenocephalemys albipes
 Ethiopian narrow-headed rat, Stenocephalemys albocaudata
 Gray-tailed narrow-headed rat, Stenocephalemys griseicauda
 Rupp's mouse, Stenocephalemys ruppi
Genus Zelotomys - stink mice
 Hildegarde's broad-headed mouse, Zelotomys hildegardeae
 Woosnam's broad-headed mouse, Zelotomys woosnami

Fossil species 

 †Karnimata (Miocene of India, Pakistan, and Kenya)
 †Karnimata darwini
 †Karnimata fejfari

References 

Old World rats and mice
Mammal tribes